The Advanced Digital Radio Testing Service (also known as ADR Lab or ADRTS) is Motorola's safety and compliance arm.  Located in Flensburg, Germany, it provides testing and certification services of mobile phones according to Global Certification Forum, Radio and Telecommunication Terminal Equipment directive (R&TTE), U.S. Federal Communications Commission and other national standards.

Motorola